Hieros (ἱερός) is Greek for "holy" or "sacred". It may refer to:

 Ancient Greek religion

See also
 
 
 Hiero (disambiguation)
 Hiera, a monotypic moth genus in the subfamily Arctiinae
 Hierapolis, an ancient Greek city located on hot springs in classical Phrygia in southwestern Anatolia
 Hieratic, the name given to a cursive writing system used for Ancient Egyptian and the principal script used to write that language from its development in the third millennium BCE until the rise of Demotic in the mid first millennium BCE
 Hierarch, an officer of a church or civic authority who by reason of office has ordinary power to execute laws
 Hierarchy, an arrangement of items (objects, names, values, categories, etc.) in which the items are represented as being "above", "below", or "at the same level as" one another
 Hierodeacon, in Eastern Orthodox Christianity is a monk who has been ordained a deacon (or deacon who has been tonsured monk)
 Hierogamy, a sacred marriage that plays out between a god and a goddess, especially when enacted in a symbolic ritual where human participants represent the deities
 Hieroglyph, a character of the ancient Egyptian writing system
 Hieromonk, a monk who is also a priest in the Orthodox Church and Eastern Catholicism
 Hieronymus, the Latin form of the Ancient Greek name Ἱερώνυμος (Hierṓnymos), meaning "with a sacred name"
 Hierophant, a person who brings religious congregants into the presence of that which is deemed holy
 Hierophany, a manifestation of the sacred
 Hierotopy, the creation of sacred spaces viewed as a special form of human creativity and also a related academic field where specific examples of such creativity are studied